Jean Salmon (21 May 1898 – 26 May 1991) was a French equestrian. He competed in two events at the 1956 Summer Olympics.

References

1898 births
1991 deaths
French male equestrians
French dressage riders
Olympic equestrians of France
Equestrians at the 1956 Summer Olympics
Place of birth missing
20th-century French people